Steve Casula (born September 7, 1987) is an American football coach and former player. He is currently the offensive coordinator at the University of Massachusetts Amherst.

Coaching career

Student coach
During Casula's undergraduate studies, he began his coaching career. He spent 2006 as an assistant coach at Delcastle Technical High School in New Castle County, Delaware. In 2007, Casula helped the newly reinstated program at Kennett High School in Kennett Square, Pennsylvania. During his junior and senior years, he worked as a student assistant coach under K. C. Keeler at Delaware. He worked primarily with the offensive line.

Western Michigan
In 2010, Casula joined Bill Cubit’s staff at Western Michigan as a graduate assistant. He worked with the offensive line for two seasons as a graduate assistant, before being promoted to tight ends and fullbacks coach for the 2012 season. He also served as the walk-on coordinator and academic coordinator. In Casula's lone season coaching the tight ends, the position improved from 17 receptions the previous year, to 46 receptions in 2012, despite five different players starting at the position.

Colgate
Casula spent the 2013 season on coach Dick Biddle's final staff at Colgate. He coached the tight ends and H-backs for the Raiders.

Davenport
Casula was the first assistant coach hired in the history of Davenport Panthers football. Hired ahead of the 2014 season, he helped build the upstart NAIA football program from the ground up as the offensive coordinator. In 2016, the first season that Davenport played, Casula's offense helped pave the way for a winning inaugural season as the Panthers finished with a 6-5 record. Following the season, he was named the interim head coach. When he was not hired as the head coach, he departed.

Ferris State
In 2017 and 2018, Casula served as the offensive coordinator at NCAA Division II power Ferris State. In his first season on staff, he helped lead the Bulldogs to the fourth straight play-off appearance and an 11-2 record. In his second season, he helped guide Ferris State to a National Title appearance, eventually falling 49-47 to Valdosta State.

Michigan
In March of 2019, Casula was hired as an offensive analyst by Jim Harbaugh and the Michigan Wolverines. While there, he worked closely with offensive coordinator Josh Gattis, and earned a promotion to senior offensive analyst ahead of the 2020 season. In 2021, Casula helped the Wolverines reach the College Football Playoff.

UMass
In December 2021, Casula was hired by Don Brown, the new head coach at UMass as the offensive coordinator and quarterbacks coach. This reunited the pair, after previously working together at Michigan from 2019-2020, where Brown was the defensive coordinator.

Personal life
Casula earned all-state honors as a senior at Salesianum School in Wilmington, Delaware. He and his wife Stephanie have three children, Audrey, Paulie, and Tommy.

References

External links
 UMass profile

1987 births
Living people
Colgate Raiders football coaches
Davenport Panthers football coaches
Delaware Fightin' Blue Hens football coaches
Ferris State Bulldogs football coaches
Michigan Wolverines football coaches
UMass Minutemen football coaches
Western Michigan Broncos football coaches
High school football coaches in Delaware
High school football coaches in Pennsylvania
University of Delaware alumni
Western Michigan University alumni
Sportspeople from Wilmington, Delaware
Coaches of American football from Delaware